Waikāne or Waikane, also known as North Koolaupoko, is an area and census-designated place in the County of Honolulu, Hawaii, United States, on the island of Oahu. It had a population of 778 at the 2010 census. In Hawaiian, koolau poko means "short windward", referring to the fact that this is the shorter of the two windward districts on the island (Koolauloa or "long windward" is the other). Koolaupoko extends from Makapuu Point on the southeast to Kaōio Point on the north. Included within the district, south of North Koolaupoko, are the largest windward towns of Kāneohe, Kailua, and Waimānalo.

Waikāne lies mostly along the coastline of Kāneohe Bay and consists of several lush valleys that extend inland to the steep face of the Koolau pali (cliff). The first valley north of Kahaluu is Waiāhole. Next is Waikāne, then Hakipuu, and northernmost is Kualoa. This area differs from the towns, valleys, and ahupuaa of the southern part of Koolaupoko in that it is mostly undeveloped, decidedly rural in character, with many small farms.

Despite the long shoreline, public access to Kāneohe Bay is somewhat limited by private holdings. A small community park at Waiāhole was enlarged and improved in 2003. A larger city and county park at Kualoa provides camping and picnic areas, a long narrow beach, and views of Mokoliʻi Islet. The south side of Kualoa Regional Park faces onto Kāneohe Bay, and the east shore is a fringing reef off the Pacific Ocean coast of northeast Oahu.

The U.S. postal code for all of North Koolaupoko is 96744 (the same as Kāneohe).

Geography 
The Waikāne census-designated place (CDP) is located at 21°29'47" North, 157°51'34" West (21.496355, -157.859321). Southward along the shore of Kāneohe Bay via Kamehameha Highway (State Rte. 83) are (from Waikāne) Waiāhole and Kahaluu. Northwest up the coast beyond Kualoa and Kaōio Point is the town of Kaaawa.

The Waikane CDP encompasses much more than the location known as Waikāne, which is but one of several valleys comprising the north end of the Koolaupoko District. The total area is 4.88% water.

Demographics 
As of the 2000 census, there were 726 people in the northern part of the Waikane CDP, with 188 households and 156 families residing there. The racial makeup of the CDP was 16.94% White, 0.14% Black or African American, 0.28% Native American, 19.15% Asian, 22.45% Pacific Islander, 1.79% from other races, and 39.26% from two or more races. 5.10% of the population were Hispanic or Latino of any race.

There were 188 households, out of which 32.4% had children under the age of 18 living with them, 59.0% were married couples living together, 14.4% had a female householder with no husband present, and 16.5% were non-families. 11.2% of all households were made up of individuals, and 4.3% had someone living alone who was 65 years of age or older. The average household size was 3.86 and the average family size was 4.09.

In the CDP the population was spread out, with 28.1% under the age of 18, 8.1% from 18 to 24, 26.9% from 25 to 44, 27.4% from 45 to 64, and 9.5% who were 65 years of age or older. The median age was 34 years. For every 100 females, there were 96.2 males. For every 100 females age 18 and over, there were 94.8 males.

The median income for a household in the CDP was $55,179, and the median income for a family was $53,625. Males had a median income of $31,786 versus $25,313 for females. The per capita income for the tract was $15,592. 11.6% of the population and 4.3% of families were below the poverty line. Out of the total population, 16.1% of those under the age of 18 and 2.0% of those 65 and older were living below the poverty line.

Education
Hawaii Department of Education operates Waiāhole Elementary School in Waikane CDP.

See also 

 Waiāhole-Waikāne struggle

References

Populated places on Oahu